Marwari College, Bhagalpur, established in 1941, is a general degree college in Bhagalpur, Bihar. It  is a constituent college of Tilka Manjhi Bhagalpur University. It offers Intermediate courses in Commerce, Arts and Science, undergraduate courses in Commerce, Arts and Science and postgraduate course in commerce. It also offers Vocational courses in BBA, BCA, BIT and B.Sc.(Biotech).

Departments

Science

Chemistry
Physics
Mathematics
Zoology
Botany
Statistics

Arts

 English
Hindi
Urdu
Sanskrit
Geography
Economics
Political Science
Sociology
Psychology
Philosophy
 Maithili
 Bangla
History

Commerce
Commerce

Vocational
BBA
BIT
BCA
BSc(Biotech)

References

External links
http://marwaricollegebgp.ac.in

Colleges affiliated to Tilka Manjhi Bhagalpur University
Education in Bhagalpur district
Educational institutions established in 1941
Universities and colleges in Bihar
1941 establishments in India